Takayoshi Matsushita (born 30 January 1953) is a Japanese archer. He competed at the 1984, 1988, 1996 and the 2000 Summer Olympics.

References

1953 births
Living people
Japanese male archers
Olympic archers of Japan
Archers at the 1984 Summer Olympics
Archers at the 1988 Summer Olympics
Archers at the 1996 Summer Olympics
Archers at the 2000 Summer Olympics
Place of birth missing (living people)
Asian Games medalists in archery
Archers at the 1982 Asian Games
Archers at the 1986 Asian Games
Archers at the 1990 Asian Games
Archers at the 1994 Asian Games
Asian Games gold medalists for Japan
Asian Games silver medalists for Japan
Asian Games bronze medalists for Japan
Medalists at the 1982 Asian Games
Medalists at the 1986 Asian Games
Medalists at the 1990 Asian Games
Medalists at the 1994 Asian Games